Boz-e Azna (also Romanized as Boz-e Aznā, Bozāznā, and Būzāznāh) is a village in Shirvan Rural District, in the Central District of Borujerd County, Lorestan Province, Iran. At the 2006 census, its population was 910, in 222 families.

References 

Towns and villages in Borujerd County